Frisky Business may refer to:

In television

Series
Animals at Work, a Canadian documentary series about animals, also called Frisky Business
Frisky Business (UK show), a documentary series about the adult toy company Lovehoney

Episodes
There have been episodes titled "Frisky Business" on a number of television series, including:
101 Dalmatians: The Series, a Disney animated series
An American in Canada, a Canadian sitcom
Betsy's Kindergarten Adventures, an American cartoon on PBS
City Guys, an American sitcom
Doogie Howser, M.D., an American comedy-drama series
Hardcore Pawn, an American reality series
Kid vs. Kat, a Canadian animated series
Out of This World (TV series), an American sitcom
Titans (U.S. TV series), a soap opera
The Tom and Jerry Show (2014 TV series), an animated series
T.U.F.F. Puppy, an American animated series

Other uses
Frisky Business, a romance novel by Vicki Lewis Thompson with Tracy South
"Frisky Business", a song on the album Turf Wars by Daggermouth

See also
Risky Business, a 1983 American comedy film starring Tom Cruise
Risky Business (disambiguation)
 Kinky Business, a 1985 pornographic film based on the 1983 comedy